Petrosaurus repens is a species of lizard in the family Phrynosomatidae. It is from the central Baja California Peninsula in northwestern Mexico.

References

repens
Lizards of North America
Endemic reptiles of Mexico
Endemic fauna of the Baja California Peninsula
Reptiles described in 1895
Taxa named by John Van Denburgh